The Sisters is a 2005 film starring Maria Bello, Mary Stuart Masterson, and Erika Christensen as the title characters; it also stars Alessandro Nivola, Rip Torn, Eric McCormack, Steven Culp, Tony Goldwyn and Chris O'Donnell. The film was written by Richard Alfieri (based on his own play) and directed by Arthur Allan Seidelman.

The Sisters is inspired by Anton Chekhov's 1901 play Three Sisters.  It tells the story of three sisters and a brother, their family dysfunctions, and the siblings dealing with their ups and downs after the death of their father.

Plot summary

Cast
 Maria Bello  - Marcia Prior Glass
 Erika Christensen - Irene Prior
 Elizabeth Banks - Nancy Pecket
 Eric McCormack - Gary Sokol
 Chris O'Donnell - David Turzin
 Mary Stuart Masterson - Olga Prior
 Tony Goldwyn - Vincent Antonelli
 Alessandro Nivola - Andrew Prior
 Rip Torn - Dr. Chebrin
 Steven Culp - Dr. Harry Glass

Production
The film was shot on location in Eugene and Cottage Grove, Oregon.

Reception
On review aggregator Rotten Tomatoes, the film holds an approval rating of 30% based on 27 reviews, with an average rating of 4.47/10. The website's critics consensus reads: "Shallow, dull, and ineffectively updated for modern audiences, The Sisters takes Chekhov's classic source material and renders it dramatically inert." On Metacritic, the film has a weighted average score of 40 out of 100, based on fourteen critics, indicating "generally favorable reviews".

The Los Angeles Times called it a "pompous, overwrought and itchingly claustrophobic psychodrama", saying "nothing can save the actors from the painfully mannered dialogue and implausible relationships."  The New York Times said the film "ladles out almost two hours' worth of carping, backstabbing and egomania" which prompts the viewer to "quickly realize no one in this film is anyone you would want to spend two hours with" and "wonder why the heck they're spending so much time with one another."

References

External links
 
 
 
 
 Thomas Morse: The Sisters Original Motion Picture Score from MovieScore Media

2005 films
2005 drama films
American drama films
Films about dysfunctional families
American films based on plays
Films shot in Eugene, Oregon
Films shot in Oregon
Films directed by Arthur Allan Seidelman
Films based on Three Sisters
2000s English-language films
2000s American films